Rainbow Canyon is a canyon located in Lincoln County, Nevada. It is also the location of the Rainbow Canyon Rock Art Site, which contains paintings that are around 10,000 years old.

References

Canyons and gorges of Nevada
Lincoln County, Nevada